George Roche may refer to:

 George Roche III (1935–2006), president of Hillsdale College, 1971–199
 George Roche (English footballer) (1889–1973), English footballer
 George Roche (Gaelic footballer), Irish Gaelic footballer